Juno commonly refers to:
Juno (mythology), the Roman goddess of marriage and queen of the gods
Juno (film), 2007

Juno may also refer to:

Arts, entertainment and media

Fictional characters
Juno, in the film Jenny, Juno
Juno, in the film Beetlejuice
Juno, a character in the manga series Beastars
Sailor Juno, a character in the manga series Sailor Moon
Juno (Dune), in the Dune universe
Juno Boyle, in the play Juno and the Paycock
Juno, in the book Juno of Taris by Fleur Beale
Juno, a playable character in the video game Jet Force Gemini
 Juno, a game character in Assassin's Creed
 Juno, in The Banner Saga game
 Juno Eclipse, in The Force Unleashed game
 Mega Man Juno, in Mega Man Legends game

Music

Musicians and groups
Juno (band), an American musical group
Juno (rapper), Finnish hip hop artist
Juno (singer), South Korean singer

Songs
 "Juno", a song by Life Without Buildings from Any Other City, 2001
 "Juno", a song by Running Touch, 2021
 "Juno", a song by Tesseract from the album Sonder, 2018
 "Juno", a song by Throwing Muses from the album House Tornado, 1988
 "Juno", a song by Tokyo Police Club from the album Elephant Shell, 2008
 "Juno", a song by Funeral for a Friend from the album Between Order and Model, 2002
 "JUNO", a song by Blank Banshee from the album MEGA

Other uses in music
 Juno (album), a 2021 album by Remi Wolf
 Juno (musical), 1959
 Juno (soundtrack), the soundtrack to the film
 Juno Awards, a Canadian music award
 Juno, synthesizers by the Roland Corporation

Business
Juno (cigarette), a German brand
Juno (company), a transportation network company formed in 2016
Juno Online Services, an internet service provider
Juno Records, an online music store
Juno Therapeutics, a biopharmaceutical company
 Juno, a German home appliance manufacturer, now part of Electrolux

People

Given name
Juno Birch, English drag queen and sculptor
Juno Calypso (born 1989), English photographer
Juno Dawson, English author
Juno Doran, visual and sound artist 
Juno Mak, Hong Kong Chinese pop singer
Juno Frankie Pierce (1864-1954), African-American suffragist
Juno Roxas (born 1967), Australian musician
Juno Sauler (born 1973), Filipino basketball coach
Juno Temple (born 1989), English actress

Surname
Madeline Juno (born 1995), German singer-songwriter

Places

United States
Juno, Georgia
Juno, Tennessee
Juno, Texas

Elsewhere
Juno, Limpopo, South Africa
Juno Beach (disambiguation)

Science and technology
Juno (plant), common name of Iris subg. Scorpiris
Juno (protein), a protein on the surface of the mammalian egg cell that facilitates fertilisation
Jiangmen Underground Neutrino Observatory (JUNO), a neutrino experiment in Jiangmen, China
Eclipse Juno, an Eclipse software development environment
OpenStack Juno, an OpenStack open-source software platform

Space
Juno (spacecraft), a NASA mission to Jupiter
3 Juno, an asteroid
Juno clump, a probable asteroid family in the vicinity of 3 Juno
Juno I, a satellite launch vehicle
Juno II, a rocket
Project Juno, a private British space programme

Transportation
 HMS Juno, a list of ships 
 MV Juno, a list of ships
 Juno (1793 ship), an English whaler and naval transport
 Juno (1797 ship), an English merchantman
 Honda Juno, a scooter
 Juno Racing Cars
 Juno, a locomotive in the South Devon Railway Dido class
 Juno, a locomotive in the GWR Banking Class

Other uses
January 2015 North American blizzard, informally called Juno

See also

Juneau (disambiguation)
Junos OS, Juniper Networks Operating System
JUNOS – Young liberal NEOS

English feminine given names
English masculine given names
English unisex given names
English-language unisex given names